The Bal du Rat mort ("Ball of the Dead Rat") is an annual masquerade ball held in Ostend, Belgium in the  casino. The event was first held in 1898.

History

In 1898, a group of members of the Cercle Cœcilia from Ostend travelled to Paris. Joined by Anglo-Belgian painter James Ensor they visited Montmartre night-spots such as the Moulin Rouge and a small venue known as "Le rat mort". On their return to Belgium, they decided to host a ball named in its honour.

Costume themes
Recent Bal du Rat mort costume themes include
 2009: "Arabian Nights"
 2010: "Out of Africa"
 2011: "Land of the Rising Sun"
 2012: "French cancan"

References

External links

  
  
  

1898 establishments in Belgium
Masquerade balls
Ostend